Nordstromia paralilacina is a moth in the family Drepanidae. It was described by Min Wang and Katsumi Yazaki in 2004. It is found in Guangdong, China.

References

Moths described in 2004
Drepaninae